Colin Brooks may refer to:

Colin Brooks (politician) (born 1970), Australian politician
Colin Brooks (drummer), American drummer
Colin Brooks, former vocalist/guitarist for Band of Heathens

See also
Collin Brooks (1893–1959), British journalist, writer, and broadcaster